Golden Gate Award may refer to:
 GLAAD Golden Gate Award, a special award presented by the Gay & Lesbian Alliance Against Defamation
 Golden Gate Award (film), a film award at the San Francisco International Film Festival